Smith Joseph, the Democratic mayor of North Miami, Florida and a physician, was born in Haiti in 1961. Joseph emigrated to the United States in 1979 with his family to Miami, Florida. He graduated from Florida A&M University and Nova Southeastern University, later opening a medical practice in 2001. Joseph was also the co-founder of the Society of Haitian American Professionals.

Following the suspension from office of Mayor Lucie Tondreau in 2014, Joseph was elected Mayor of North Miami against former Mayor Kevin Burns.

After the shooting of Charles Kinsey, Mayor Joseph apologized to the family of the victim and promised a complete investigation stating "I have made it clear that I will not tolerate anything that goes against the process."

On 28 May 2019, Philippe Bien-Aime was sworn to succeed Joseph as mayor of North Miami.

References

1961 births
Living people
American politicians of Haitian descent
Haitian emigrants to the United States
Mayors of places in Florida
Florida Democrats
People from North Miami, Florida
African-American mayors in Florida
21st-century African-American people
20th-century African-American people